Tess of the d'Urbervilles is an 1891 novel by Thomas Hardy.

Tess of the d'Urbervilles may also refer to:
Tess of the d'Urbervilles (1913 film), 1913 American silent drama film
Tess of the d'Urbervilles (1924 film), 1924 American silent drama film
Tess, 1979 film directed by Roman Polanski
Tess of the D'Urbervilles (1998 TV serial), 1998 British television serial
Tess of the D'Urbervilles (2008 TV serial), 2008 British television serial